Fred Joseph Federici III (born 1965) is an American attorney who formerly served as the acting United States attorney for the District of New Mexico. He was previously a nominee to be a United States district judge of the United States District Court for the District of New Mexico.

Early life and education 

Federici was born in Raleigh, North Carolina. He earned a Bachelor of Arts from the College of William & Mary in 1988 and a Juris Doctor from the University of Virginia School of Law in 1991.

Career 

Federici began his career as an associate at Venable LLP, in Washington, D.C. In 1995, he became an assistant United States attorney for the District of New Mexico. He was the office's criminal chief from 2008–2010, a line supervisor from 2010–2018, and has been its first assistant United States attorney since 2018. 

Upon the resignation of John C. Anderson on January 2, 2021, Federici assumed office as the acting U.S. attorney. He served until May 24, 2022, when Alexander M.M. Uballez was sworn in.

Expired nomination to district court 

On May 28, 2020, President Trump announced his intent to nominate Federici to serve as a United States district judge for the United States District Court for the District of New Mexico. On June 18, 2020, his nomination was sent to the Senate. President Trump nominated Federici to the seat vacated by Judge Robert C. Brack, who took senior status on July 25, 2018. On January 3, 2021, his nomination was returned to the President under Rule XXXI, Paragraph 6 of the United States Senate.

References 

1965 births
Living people
20th-century American lawyers
21st-century American lawyers
Assistant United States Attorneys
College of William & Mary alumni
New Mexico lawyers
People from Raleigh, North Carolina
United States Attorneys for the District of New Mexico
University of Virginia School of Law alumni